Oleh Yevheniyovych Voronko (born 15 May 1974) is a Ukrainian politician currently serving as a People's Deputy of Ukraine representing Ukraine's 103rd electoral district since 2019. Elected as a member of Servant of the People, he has been a member of Restoration of Ukraine since 2022.

Early life and career 
Oleh Yevheniyovych Voronko was born on 15 May 1974 in the city of Svitlovodsk, then under the Soviet Union.

Prior to becoming a People's Deputy of Ukraine, Voronko worked in the IT sector, developing technology designed to improve the durability of technological equipment. He also founded Instant Foods Group and Agrotrade Group, the latter of which is a produce transport company.

Political career 
In the 2019 Ukrainian parliamentary election, Voronko was the candidate of Servant of the People in Ukraine's 103rd electoral district. At the time of the election, he was an independent. He was successfully elected, defeating former mayor of Oleksandriia and People's Deputy  (belonging to Opposition Platform — For Life) with 38.01% against Tsapiuk's 14.75%.

In the Verkhovna Rada (parliament of Ukraine), Voronko joined the Servant of the People faction and the Verkhovna Rada Committee on Finances, Taxes, and Customs Policy, as well as the Kirovohradshchyna inter-factional association. In 2019, he declared an income of ₴123 million, and the same year was involved in a controversy after he was among the Servant of the People deputies to vote against elimination of intermediary sites for property appraisal. On 8 November 2021, Voronko was listed as one of the Servants of the People joining Smart Politics, a political association created by former Chairman of the Verkhovna Rada Dmytro Razumkov.

In January 2022, Voronko allegedly came under investigation by the State Bureau of Investigation for forging documents in a court case. Four days following a search of his home, Voronko left Servant of the People, claiming his membership in Smart Politics had brought pressure upon him from state authorities.

In May 2022, following the 2022 Russian invasion of Ukraine, Voronko joined the Restoration of Ukraine group.

References 

1974 births
Living people
Ninth convocation members of the Verkhovna Rada
People from Svitlovodsk
Servant of the People (political party) politicians